These are the Billboard Hot 100 number-one hits of 1976.

That year, 15 acts earn their first number one songs, such as The Bay City Rollers, C. W. McCall, Rhythm Heritage, Johnnie Taylor, The Bellamy Brothers, The Sylvers, Starland Vocal Band, The Manhattans, Kiki Dee, Wild Cherry, Walter Murphy, Rick Dees, and Chicago. Paul Simon and John Sebastian, having already hit number one with Simon & Garfunkel and The Lovin' Spoonful, respectively, also earn their first number one songs as solo acts. Diana Ross was the only act to have more than one song reach number one with two.

Chart history

Number-one artists

See also
1976 in music
List of Cash Box Top 100 number-one singles of 1976

References

Sources
Fred Bronson's Billboard Book of Number 1 Hits, 5th Edition
Joel Whitburn's Top Pop Singles 1955-2008, 12 Edition
Joel Whitburn Presents the Billboard Hot 100 Charts: The Seventies
Additional information obtained can be verified within Billboard's online archive services and print editions of the magazine.

United States Hot 100
1976